The De Grey River is a river located in the Pilbara region of Western Australia. It was named on 16 August 1861 by the explorer and surveyor Francis Gregory after Thomas de Grey, 2nd Earl de Grey, who was at the time the president of the Royal Geographical Society.

The river rises south of Callawa at the confluence of the Oakover and the Nullagine rivers and flows in a west-north-westerly direction eventually discharging into the Indian Ocean via Breaker Inlet about 80 km north-east of Port Hedland.

Its stream bed is 100 to 130 metres wide, dry throughout most of the year . The shore's land is rich in grass and fertile, featuring trees.

The river flows through many semi-permanent pools of water on the way to the coast, including Yukerakine Pool, Muccanoo Pool, Talyirina Pool, Wardoomoondener Pool and Triangle Pool.

The river has eleven tributaries, including the Oakover River, Nullagine River, Coongan River, East Strelley River, Shaw River, Miningarra Creek, Egg Creek and Kookenyia Creek.

References

Further reading
  — An account of the cutter Mystery and the barque Tien Tsin in taking stock for Walter Padbury and Henry Welland to De Grey in 1863, principally from the diaries of Charles Nairn and William Shakespeare Hall.
  — William Shakespeare Hall's journal of the 1861 expedition.

Rivers of the Pilbara region